Green Valley Lake is located in Payson, Arizona. Green Valley Lake is a reservoir connected to two smaller lakes in Green Valley Park. These lakes were constructed from 1993 to 1996 for ground water recharge.

Fish species
 Rainbow Trout
 Largemouth Bass
 Crappie
 Sunfish
 Channel Catfish
 Bluegill

References

External links
 
 Arizona Fishing Locations Map
 Arizona Boating Locations Facilities Map
 Video of Green Valley Lake, Arizona

Reservoirs in Gila County, Arizona
Reservoirs in Arizona
1990s establishments in Arizona